Smithborough or Smithboro is a village in County Monaghan, Ireland. It is within the townlands of Mullaghduff and Mullaghbrack. It is roughly midway between Monaghan Town and Clones on the N54. Nearby  villages within 6–7 km (3 or 4 miles away) are Threemilehouse, Scotstown, Ballinode, and Newbliss all within County Monaghan and Roslea in County Fermanagh.  The local football team is Éire Óg, who wear blue with a gold band.

Railways
The Ulster Railway opened Smithborough railway station on 2 March 1863. In 1876 the Great Northern Railway (Ireland) was formed.  The station and line was closed on 14 October 1957.

See also 
 List of towns and villages in Ireland
 Ulster Canal

References

Towns and villages in County Monaghan